The Ajmer Jain temple, also known as Soniji Ki Nasiyan, is an architecturally rich Jain temple. It was built in the late nineteenth century. The main chamber, known as the Swarna Nagari "City of Gold", has several gold-plated wooden figures, depicting several figures in the Jain religion. This golden chamber of the temple uses 1000 kg of gold to carve out a depiction of Ayodhya.

Kurt Titze, in his book, "Jainism: A Pictorial Guide to the Religion of Non-Violence" (1998, p. 143), writes on Soniji Ki Nasiyan:

History

Greatly revered by the Digambar sect of the Jains, the Nasiyan temple is dedicated to Rishabhdev, first of the 24 tirthankara by Rai Bahadur Seth Moolchand and Nemichand Soni. It is situated on Prithvi Raj Marg in Ajmer, the heart of Rajasthan state in India. The foundation of this magnificent Jain temple was laid on 10 October 1864 and the image of Rishabhdev (Adinath), was installed in the Sanctum Sanctorum on 26 May 1865. This work was carried out under the able guidance of the great scholar Pandit Sadasukhdasji of Jaipur.

The name of the temple is Siddhkoot Chaityalaya. It is also known as 'Red Temple' as it is built of red sandstone or 'Nasiyan of Seth Moolchand Soni' signifying the founder’s name. After the Svarna Nagri was added to the temple in 1895 A.D. it popularly began to be called as 'Sone ka Mandir' or 'Soni Mandir' emphasizing the golden structure as well as the family name. The halls of this temple are adorned with fascinating series of large, gilt wooden figures and delicate paintings that display scenes from Jain scriptures.

About Temple 

The entrance gate of the temple is made of red sandstone brought from Karauli.  In front of the gateway is the marble staircase, leading to the main temple, which is embellished with the images of the Tirthankars. The columns inside the temple are noted for their unique design. The mulnayak of the temple is a large white marble idol of Rishabhanatha. The Abhiṣeka of deity is organised daily with water, milk etc. The temple features a massive gateway with a three way pointed high rise arches with an elaborate Jharokhas.

Vedi’s

The central image is of Rishabhdev seated in the "Samavasarana" - in which He imparts true knowledge to the suffering humanity, so that they get liberated from the entanglements of life and death.  In the year 2005, the 3 Vedi's were renovated and all the idols of Tirthankaras were re-installed amidst religious rituals and ceremonies. In this portion only Jains are allowed to perform their religious rituals.

Shantinath statue
54 feet Shantinatha statue is being built here. This statue will be the largest Shantinath statue in the world.

Manastambha

On entering this historical temple one gets the view of the beautifully and artistically designed 82 feet high Manastambha.   
R. B. Seth Tikamchand Soni laid the foundation and R. B. Seth Sir Bhagchand Soni built this Manastambha. He, along with his sons Prabhachand, Nirmalchand & Sushilchand consecrated and installed the images of the Jain Tirthankars in it. A big function was held for ten days in June 1953, where along with the members of the Soni family, thousands of others participated.

Library

In the year 1974, in the auspicious presence of 108 Acharya Vidyasagar, a big library was established by R.B. Seth Sir Bhagchand Soni. The library houses rare Jain scriptures which are extensively used for research by scholars.

Visitors

The temple is being visited by many tourists annually. Distinguished Visitors include India's first President Dr. Rajendra Prasad, Prime Ministers Jawaharlal Nehru, Indra Gandhi, Morarji Desai & Rajiv Gandhi, Commander-in-Chief General K.M.Kariappa. Pre-independence the Viceroy and Vicereine of India Lord & Lady Irwin and Lady Willingdon also visited.

Svarna Nagri
It came to R.B. Seth Moolchand Soni’s mind that 5 Kalyanakas of Lord Rishabhdev could be displayed in models. Accordingly, the work started in Jaipur and it took 25 years to complete these replicas of Ayodhya and Mount Sumeru. The whole structure, covered with gold leaf, is made according to the descriptions contained in Adi Purana written by Shri Jina Sen Acharya.

On completion, the models were displayed in Museum Hall in Jaipur. A big fair was celebrated for ten days in 1895 A.D which was attended by Maharaja Madhosinghji of Jaipur. The models were thereafter installed in the building behind the main Temple. This Hall is richly painted in variegated colours, and the walls and ceiling are covered with glass mosaic work.

Garbha Kalyanak (Conception):

The great soul of the Lord is emulated and glorified by the celestials even six months before He comes into his mother’s womb. Saudharma Indra, the Lord of the celestials, ordered Kubera to rain down priceless jewels in the palace of his father Maharaj Nabhiraj, thus announcing the coming of the Saviour of the World. The golden city of Ayodhya was constructed by the celestials according to the wishes of Indra.
After six months, the mother Marudevi saw sixteen symbolic dreams, signifying that she was going to be the mother of The Tirthankar.

Janma Kalyanak (Birth):

When Lord Rishabhdev was born in the royal palace in the center of Ayodhya, the thrones of Indras vibrated indicating the birth of the Divine Child. The celestials marched towards the city with great majesty. Indra, after completing three rounds of the city took the new born Tirthankar on the 'Airavata (Elephant) to Mt. Sumeru. On this golden mountain lies Panduk Shila upon which the Tirthankar was seated for Mahabhisheka. 

Tap Kalyanak (Renunciation):

As Rishabhdev became engrossed in worldly affairs, Indra appeared before Him with Apsara Nilanjana. She danced before Him and suddenly disappeared, discarding her mortal coil. This reminded Rishabhdev of the transient nature of the World and He decided to renounce it.

Installing in his place his eldest son Bharat, He left the palace followed by 4000 other kings. Indra followed by the other celestials, took Rishabhdev in procession to the Triveni, the confluence of the Ganga, Yamuna and Sarasvati at Prayag (Allahabad) where under the shade of the Akshayavat (sacred banyan tree) Rishabhdev gave up the world, including his clothes and gave himself to contemplation. He pulled out his hair (Kesh Lonch) by his own hands depicting his extreme detachment to all worldly and bodily comforts.
Lord Rishabhdev took his first meal after one year of austerities and penance. Raja Shreyans, the king of Gajapura (now Hastinapur), had the good fortune of being the first person to offer him a meal in the form of sugarcane Juice on the 3rd day of the bright fortnight of the month of Vaishakha. This occasion is celebrated even today as Akshaya Tritiya.

Keval Jnan Kalyanak (Omniscience):

After 1000 years of austerities and penance, Lord Rishabhdev attained Keval Jnan (Omniscience) at Mount Kailash. Indra arranged a beautiful place of congregation known as "Samavasarana" where the Lord preached the doctrine of non-attachment to the world. Celestials, humans, and even birds & animals gathered around the lord. Tirthankars attain the power of walking in sky after attaining Omniscience. 225 Golden lotuses are placed beneath the Lord's feet during his travel by Indra.

Moksha Kalyanak:

On Mount Kailash where Lord Rishabhdev attained Salvation or Nirvana, his eldest son Bharat, the first Chakravartin(emperor of Bharat Kshetra), constructed seventy two magnificent golden temples.

Photo gallery

See also

Panch Kalyanaka
Nareli Jain Temple
Jainism in Rajasthan

References

Sources

Citation

Book

Web

External links 
 

Jain temples in Rajasthan
Tourist attractions in Ajmer
Buildings and structures in Ajmer
19th-century Jain temples